10 ans de succès, released with the yellow cover band 85-95 le meilleur de Marc Lavoine''', is a 1995 compilation recorded by French artist Marc Lavoine. It was the singer's first best of and his seventh album overall. It was released in October 1995 and achieved success in France and Belgium (Wallonia), where it reached the top four. This compilation contains all the singer's singles from the beginning of hi career, plus two unreleased songs : "Reste sur moi", a song previously written for Patricia Kaas on her 1993 album Je te dis vous, and "Nu".

Track listings

Source : Allmusic''.

Releases

Personnel

Recording
 Arrangements : Pascal Stive, except 14,15, Eric Benzi (16), Hervé Leduc (18)
 Mixed by J.P.B., except :
 1,2 : Bernard Estardy
 4 : Manu Guyot
 7,16 : Tony Visconti
 18 : Justin Niebank
 Produced by Fabrice Aboulker for AVREP except :
 1,3,14,15 : Fabrice Aboulker for J.P.B.
 16,17 : Tony Visconti
 18 : Bernard Saint-Paul for B.S.P. Conseil
 Illustrations : Hervé Di Rosa
 Photo : Vincent Knapp

Editions
 2-6, 8-12 : AVREP
 1 : Société des Nouvelles Éditions Eddie Barclay droits transférés à Warner Chappell Music France / R.M.F.
 7 : AVREP / Virgin
 13-15,17,20 : AVREP / Les Amours du Dimanche
 16 : AVREP / JRG
 18 : Société des Éditions Musicales Piano Blanc
 19 : Note de Blues / Les Amours du Dimanche

Certifications

Charts

References

Marc Lavoine albums
1995 greatest hits albums
RCA Records compilation albums